Saliha Naciye Kadın ("the devout one" and "saved and freed"; born Zeliha Ankuap; 1887 – 1923) was the last consort of Sultan Abdul Hamid II of the Ottoman Empire.

Early life
Of Abkhazian origin, Saliha Naciye Hanım was born in 1887. Born as Zeliha Ankuap, she was the daughter of Aslan Bey Ankuap. In 1901, Kabasakal Mehmed Pasha, presented her for service in the Yıldız Palace, where her name according to the custom of the Ottoman court was changed to Saliha Naciye.

Marriage
Three years into service, Abdul Hamid took notice of Saliha Naciye, and they married on 4 November 1904 in the Yıldız Palace. She was 17 and he was 62. She was his thirteenth and last consort. She was given the title of "Sixth Ikbal". She was very sweet, gentle and modest, characteristics appreciated by the sultan. A year after the marriage, on 17 May 1905, she gave birth to her first child, a son, Şehzade Mehmed Abid, and three years later on 16 January 1908 to her second child, a daughter, Samiye Sultan, who died on 24 January 1909. After her daughter birth, she was given the honorary rank of "Fifth Kadın", with title Saliha Naciye Kadın. Saliha Naciye was by far the favorite consort of Abdülhamid II, followed by Müşfika Kadın and Pesend Hanım.

In the 1909 mutiny, Kabasakal ("twisted beard") was shaved and publicly hanged, and on 27 April 1909, Abdul Hamid was deposed, and sent into exile in Thessaloniki. Naciye was close to him, and so she and her son Abid accompanied him. But after Thessaloniki fell to Greece in 1912, Abdülhamid returned to Istanbul  and settled in the Beylerbeyi Palace, where he died in 1918. Saliha Naciye refused to abandon Abdülhamid and, together with Müşfika Kadın, demanded to stay with him in Beylerbeyi Palace until his death. Pesend Hanım, on the other hand, was unable to obtain permission and therefore never saw her husband again, suffering greatly from this, so much so that she shaved her head as a sign of mourning at his death.

Last years and death
After Abdul Hamid's death, Saliha Naciye settled in the mansion of Şehzade Mehmed Selim located in Serencebey. 

She died in 1923, and was buried in the mausoleum of Sultan Mahmud II, located at Divan Yolu street.

Issue

In literature and popular culture
Saliha Naciye Hanım is a character in Tim Symonds' historical novel Sherlock Holmes and The Sword of Osman (2015).
In the 2017 TV series Payitaht: Abdülhamid, Saliha Naciye Hanım is portrayed by Turkish actress Vildan Atasever.

See also
Ikbal (title)
Ottoman Imperial Harem
List of consorts of the Ottoman sultans

Annotations

References

Sources

20th-century consorts of Ottoman sultans
1887 births
Georgians from the Ottoman Empire
People from Batumi
1923 deaths
People from the Ottoman Empire of Abkhazian descent
Abdul Hamid II